Arthur Kelly may refer to:

 Arthur Kelly (rugby) (1886–1965), New Zealand rugby footballer
 Arthur D. Kelly (1873–1939), American politician
 Arthur Randolph Kelly (1900–1979), American archaeologist 
 Arthur Rolland Kelly (1878–1959), American architect